Chelis kindermanni is a moth in the family Erebidae. It was described by Otto Staudinger in 1867. It is found in Russia (southern Urals, Omsk, Novosibirsk, Krasnoyarsk, Altai, Khakasi, Baikal, Transbaikalia, Middle Amur, southern Primorye), Mongolia and China (Qinghai, Shanxi, Heilongjiang, Liaonin).

This species was moved from the genus Sibirarctia to Chelis as a result of phylogenetic research published in 2016.

Subspecies
Chelis kindermanni kindermanni
Chelis kindermanni albovittata (Rothschild, 1910) (Tibet) 
Chelis kindermanni pomona (Staudinger, 1897) (southern banks of Lake Baikal, Transbaikalia, Upper Amur, Mongolia)
Chelis kindermanni pretiosa (Staudinger, 1887) (Middle Amur, Primorye, Heilongjiang)

References

Moths described in 1867
Arctiina